Royal Copeland (October 12, 1924 – August 8, 2011) was a Canadian football running back who played at the elite level from 1943 to 1956.

Copeland won four Grey Cups with the Toronto Argonauts. Along with Joe Krol they were known as the Gold Dust Twins. Copeland is the only player to score a touchdown in three consecutive Grey Cup games: 1945, 1946, and 1947. He became a member of the Canadian Football Hall of Fame in 1988. 

During the Second World War when the Argonaut football operations were suspended, Royal Copeland played in the Ontario Rugby Football Union (ORFU) in 1943 with Toronto Navy .

1924 births
2011 deaths
Calgary Stampeders players
Canadian Football Hall of Fame inductees
Canadian football running backs
Deaths from Alzheimer's disease
Players of Canadian football from Ontario
Canadian football people from Toronto
Toronto Argonauts players
Ontario Rugby Football Union players
Deaths from dementia in California